Saiyan may refer to:

 Saiyan, a fictional extraterrestrial race in the Dragon Ball media franchise
 Saiyan (film), a 1951 Bollywood film
 Ryan Danford (born 1985) also known as "Saiyan", American semi-professional Halo player 
 Saiyan, Agra, a village in the Agra district of Uttar Pradesh, India